David Allen Welter is a Republican member of the Illinois House of Representatives representing the 75th district. The 75th district includes all or parts of Grundy, Kendall, LaSalle and Will counties. Prior to his appointment, he served as chairman of the Grundy County Board.

John D. Anthony resigned from his seat in the Illinois House of Representatives effective June 17, 2016. Local Republican leaders appointed Welter to the vacancy and Welter was sworn in July 9, 2016. He is also the Republican spokesperson for the Committee on Energy & Environment. On January 25, 2021, he was appointed House Republican Conference chairperson for the 102nd General Assembly.

As of July 3, 2022, Representative Welter is a member of the following Illinois House committees:

 Appropriations - Public Safety Committee (HAPP)
 Energy & Environment Committee (HENG)
 Family Law & Probate Subcommittee (HJUA-FLAW)
 Health Care Availability & Access Committee (HHCA)
 Judiciary - Civil Committee (HJUA)
 Public Utilities Committee (HPUB)
 Utilities Subcommittee (HPUB-UTIL)

In the 2022 Republican primary, Jed Davis defeated Welter for renomination in the newly drawn 75th district.

References

External links
David A. Welter at Illinois General Assembly
By session: 102nd, 101st, 100th, 99th

Living people
People from Morris, Illinois
Republican Party members of the Illinois House of Representatives
21st-century American politicians
County board members in Illinois
1991 births